The 1939 South American Basketball Championship was the 7th edition of this tournament. It was held in Rio de Janeiro, Brazil and won by the host, Brazil national basketball team.  5 teams competed.

Final rankings

Results

Each team played the other four teams once, for a total of four games played by each team and 10 overall in the tournament.

External links

FIBA.com archive for SAC1939

1939
S
B
1939 in Brazilian sport
Champ
20th century in Rio de Janeiro
International sports competitions in Rio de Janeiro (city)
April 1939 sports events